Narayanganj Suktara Sangsad, is the professional football team of Narayanganj, Bangladesh that has competed in the Bangladesh Premier League (BPL). They play at the 15,000 capacity Bangladesh Army Stadium.

History
The Shuktara Jubo Sangshad won the title of the Bashundhara Champions Club Cup, beating Feni Soccer Club in 2009. When the team became the champions, they were provided with taka three lakhs.

The club played in the BPL for the first time in the 2009–10 season when it was ranked 12 out of 13 and relegated. They played 24 matches in the tournament, of which they won four.

Squad
Narayanganj Suktara Sangsad Squad for the 2009–10 season.

Honors
Champion: Bashundhara Champions Club Cup 2009

Notes

Football clubs in Bangladesh
Sport in Narayanganj